The Brooklyn Bottling Group is one of the largest independently owned beverage and food company in the United States. Founded by Jack Miller in 1936, the company started out by selling seltzers and syrups door to door in Brooklyn neighborhoods. The second generation, Arnold Miller, acquired the first bottling facility and the company began to produce soft drinks in 1947. In its third generation, Eric Miller has expanded the company's line up to include fruit juices.

The Brooklyn Bottling Group bottling facility is based in Milton, New York and has warehouses and distribution centers in Brooklyn, Miami, Orlando and Atlanta. The company manufactures, distributes, imports and sell over 50 brands of soft drinks, juices, food and household items. Its products ship to 23 states across the country, primarily in the east coast. 

The company was once involved in a controversy with its soft-drink line "Tropical Fantasy" in the early 1990s. In April 1991 a rumor spread throughout black neighborhoods that the Ku Klux Klan secretly owned the company and its line of Tropical Fantasy soft drinks would sterilize black men. The rumors were spread through flyers and were later found to be false.

Drinks
 Squeez'r Juices and Teas
 Nature's Own Fresh Pressed Juices
 Tropical Fantasy Juices, Soft Drinks, Bottled Water and Energy Drinks
 Best Health Spring Water, Seltzer, and Soft Drinks
 D & G Jamaican Soft Drinks
 Vitamalt non alcoholic malt beverage
 Postobon Colombian Soft Drinks
 Pony Malta non alcoholic Malt beverage
 Country Club Soft Drinks from Dominican Republic
 Cola Lacaye from Haiti

 Tropical Rhythms juices

Malt beverages
 Ballantine Ale
 Country Club Malt Liquor
 Private Stock Malt Liquor
 Vitamalt (non alcoholic)
 Pony Malta (non alcoholic)

See also
 List of bottling companies

References 

Drink companies of the United States
Companies based in New York (state)
1936 establishments in New York City
American companies established in 1936
Food and drink companies established in 1936
Food and drink companies based in New York City